CubaOne Foundation, also known as CubaOne, is a Miami-based not-for-profit organization that sponsors free 7-day trips to Cuba for young Cuban Americans ages 22–35.

It was founded by Daniel Jimenez, Giancarlo Sopo, Cherie Cancio, and Andrew Jimenez.

History
CubaOne Foundation was launched in 2016. It is modeled loosely after Birthright Israel, the Jewish organization that offers young Jews free trips to Israel. The organization was founded by four Cuban Americans from Florida: Daniel Jimenez, Giancarlo Sopo, Cherie Cancio, and Andrew Jimenez.

Eligibility
Eligible applicants must be 22-35 year-old Cuban Americans.

Funding
CubaOne Foundation is funded by its founders.

Reception
Since its launch, CubaOne Foundation has received mainly favorable press coverage. It was called "a groundbreaking organization" by Vivala and "a wonderful initiative"  by NBC Miami. An opinion editorial in The New York Times said that the program is an idea that Cuban American politicians "should ponder."

References

Non-profit organizations based in Florida
Organizations established in 2016
American people of Cuban descent
Hispanic and Latino American organizations
Cuban-American culture in Miami
Cuban Canadian
Cuban-American history
Cuba–United States relations
Caribbean American
Cuban diaspora